Poppens is a surname. Notable people with the surname include:

Chelsea Poppens (born 1991), American basketball player
Tjapko Poppens (born 1970), Dutch politician

See also
Poppen